Dhruva Natchathiram is an upcoming Indian Tamil-language spy thriller film directed by Gautham Vasudev Menon, which stars Vikram. The film features music composed by Harris Jayaraj, whereas cinematography handled by Manoj Paramahamsa, Jomon T. John, Santhana Krishnan Ravichandran and editing done by Praveen Antony.

The film was initially announced with Suriya in 2013, but months after the announcement, Menon shelved the project citing creative differences with the actor. He later hinted a chance of possible revival during mid-2015, and met several actors to cast, before finalising Vikram in the lead role. The film which began production in 2016, was shot in seven countries, and has been languishing in production hell since then owing to Menon's financial constraints.

Premise 
John, a New York-based undercover operative and his team, are entrusted with a secret mission to bring back their team leader, who has been missing mysteriously.

Cast 

 Vikram as Dhruva, John and Joshua
 Ritu Varma as Anupama
 Aishwarya Rajesh as Ragini
 R. Parthiban
 Simran
 Dhivyadharshini
 Vinayakan
 Arjun Das
 Raadhika Sarathkumar
 Vamsi Krishna
 Sathish Krishnan
 Munna Simon
 Salim Baig
 Maya S. Krishnan
 Preethi Nedumaran
 Abhirami Venkatachalam

Production

Pre-production 
Following the successes of Kaakha Kaakha (2003) and Vaaranam Aayiram (2008), director Gautham Vasudev Menon and Suriya began discussions on another project featuring the duo. After rejecting two scripts including films titled Enai Noki Paayum Thota and Thuppariyum Anandhan, Suriya was impressed and accepted to work on the spy-thriller film Dhruva Natchathiram, which Menon hoped to turn into a franchise. Revealed to be produced by Menon too, the team released a series of posters in April 2013 indicating that the film would feature 12 pivotal characters. The film was officially launched at the director's office in May 2013, with a few test shots also taken during the month.

A. R. Rahman was confirmed as the film's music composer, while Rajeevan and Anthony were announced as the art director and editor respectively. Menon confirmed later in the month that Parthiepan and Simran had been added to the cast to play supporting roles. Actors Arun Vijay and Sudhanshu Pandey, were also signed on to play characters with negative shades. Trisha was signed on to play the lead female role in the film, after reports that Asin, Sameera Reddy, Amala Paul and Priya Anand had been considered. However, the film's first schedule was repeatedly postponed and ultimately by October 2013, Menon and Suriya parted ways citing creative differences. Suriya released a press note revealing that Menon had been tinkering the script for six months without any such progress and that he could wait no longer as he had committed to other films. He also recalled that the pair had a similar unfruitful experience when making a film titled Chennaiyil Oru Mazhaikaalam in early 2004.

Development 
Following the release of Yennai Arindhaal (2015), Menon revived Dhruva Natchathiram and revealed he was working on the script by March 2015. Vikram was subsequently signed for the lead role, while Nayanthara was also selected to play the leading female role. The project failed to find financiers, before he picked up pre-production work on the film again during November 2015, hoping to start the film with Jayam Ravi. Despite progress, the film did not take off as a result of Ravi's busy schedule. Menon then narrated the script to producer Kalaipuli S. Thanu, who set up a meeting for Menon to discuss the script with Rajinikanth. The actor liked the idea of the film, but later turned down the offer and chose to work with Thanu on Kabali (2016). In November 2016, Menon revived the project with Vikram and began working on the script again. Production began in early January 2017 in New York City, with a series of promotional posters released by the team. Harris Jayaraj who has worked on most of Gautham Menon's films, was confirmed as the composer. Actress Anu Emmanuel was added to the cast and also took part in an initial photoshoot. A two-minute teaser was released in the same month; it was shot in fourteen hours around Manhattan, New York City with a Canon 5D SLR camera by cinematographer Jomon T. John.

Casting 
The film began production with only Vikram and Anu Emmanuel as confirmed members of the cast in January 2017. In early February 2017, Anu Emmanuel opted out of the film citing scheduling issues following Vikram's decision to alter his schedule, so that he could simultaneously shoot for Sketch (2018) directed by Vijay Chander. Gautham Menon signed on actress Ritu Varma to replace her, after being impressed by Varma's performance in the Telugu film Pelli Choopulu (2016). Aishwarya Rajesh was also then signed to portray another leading female character in the film. Prithviraj Sukumaran reported to be the main antagonist, but the news claimed to be false. The team also re-signed Parthiepan to act in the film, with his character tweaked from his role in the original script.

Jomon later opted out of the film during March 2017 citing scheduling issues and was replaced as the film's cinematographer by Santhana Krishnan, the son of Ravi K. Chandran. Santhana Krishnan also opted out of the film in June 2017 and was replaced by Manoj Paramahamsa, who collaborated with Menon again after Nadunisi Naaygal (2011). During the same month, a bevy of supporting actors were signed to portray roles in the film including veteran actresses Raadhika and Simran, while rookie actresses Dhivyadharshini, Shravanthi Sainath and Maya S. Krishnan were also added to the cast. Three of Menon's former proteges Vamsi Krishna, Salim Baig and Sathish Krishnan also were selected to portray roles, as was Munna Simon. In mid-April 2018, it was revealed that Malayalam actor Vinayakan was a part of the film's cast, playing the leading antagonist in the film. It eventually marked Vinayakan's third Tamil film after Thimiru (2006) and Maryan (2013).

Filming 
Following the shoot of the teaser in New York City, the team moved to Coonoor to begin the first schedule in late January 2017. Following a brief shoot in the town, the team moved to Chennai for a further short schedule. After a schedule break, the shoot continued intermittently throughout Chennai in early 2017 as Vikram simultaneously worked around his commitments for his other film Sketch. During the initial schedules, scenes involving Vikram, Aishwarya Rajesh and Ritu Varma were primarily shot. The makers planned to shoot two schedules abroad, after a brief break, before wrapping the schedules in Chennai and Coonoor.

Despite initially wanting to film sequences in the US, the team later chose to use Eastern Europe as the main foreign backdrop for the ease of acquiring permission to shoot and sort out visas. The shoot began in Slovenia during mid-June 2017 with Vikram and the ensemble supporting cast, before moving to Bulgaria by the end of the month. After the completion of their work in Bulgaria, the team moved to Abu Dhabi, United Arab Emirates to film scenes in the desert and worked in extremely warm temperatures. Following the end of the schedule in mid-July 2017, Menon revealed that approximately thirty more days of shoot were required. During mid-August 2017, it was reported that Vikram had resumed shooting for the film, with substantial portions being shot in Chennai.

In late August 2017, the team travelled to Tbilisi, Georgia to continue the shoot, with the ensemble cast joining the schedule. After several days of shoot in Georgia, the team were briefly left stranded after being denied permission to enter Turkey as a result of a document oversight. After two days of no shoot, they were granted permission to travel to Istanbul and continued filming. Following the schedule in Turkey, they returned to Georgia to continue the shoot for ten days.

The film subsequently experienced production hell owing to Menon's financial constraints, with several other films associated with the director such as Enai Noki Paayum Thota, Naragasooran, Nenjam Marappathillai and the eventually shelved Pon Ondru Kandein also put on hold. During the period of delay, a second teaser trailer was released on YouTube during June 2018, and garnered positive reviews from critics. The very same month, Menon claimed that the film entered its final leg of shooting and will be completed within August 2018, although there was no information about the process. On 2 November 2019, Menon said the film had undergone post-production which will be completed within 60 days, and may resume shooting for patchwork scenes after his prior commitments with Joshua Imai Pol Kaakha; though by March 2021, Vikram had not yet dubbed his lines, one of the few things needed to finish post-production. Vikram began dubbing for his portions in March 2022. In August, Menon shared a picture of himself and Vikram with the caption "The stars will align!", leading to the media believing the project was nearing completion. In February 2023, Menon resumed filming and completed the remaining portions.

Music 
The film's music and background score was composed by Harris Jayaraj. It marked Jayaraj's seventh collaboration with Gautham Vasudev Menon; since the duo's debut film Minnale (2001) Jayaraj continued to work with Menon in all of his films, until he split up and later collaborated with the director in Yennai Arindhaal (2015). The untitled song in the first teaser was written and sung by Aaryan Dinesh Kanagaratnam and Sri Rascol.

"Oru Manam" was the first song recorded by Jayaraj for this film. Menon revealed the song title officially in June 2018, which has been recorded during the period of the film's delay. In November 2018, despite claims from the makers that the song will be released within the end of this month, it did not happen, due to delay in the film's production. A year later, in September 2020, it was reported that the makers planning to release the song during October, and revealed the details of the song that it had lyrics written by Thamarai and sung by Karthik and Shashaa Tirupati. On 7 October 2020, Sony Music, which acquired the film's audio rights, released the video song of the film along with its single track through digital platforms. The song received huge response from listeners, praising Jayaraj for its soothing composition and the melodious tunes.

Release 
The film's promotional posters cited the release of the film scheduled for August 2017, however it was postponed to April 2018 due to delays in the film production. Menon eventually cited that the film will release during the occasion of Diwali (6 November 2018), which did not happen. The film further delayed after Menon's financial constraints surrounding its production house affected several other films of the director. Despite claims from Menon that the shoot would be completed and the film would be released on 15 November 2019, the film continued to be delayed throughout 2019.

In July 2020, Menon stated that the film will be scheduled for release in theatres, after multiple films headed for a direct release on over-the-top media service platforms as a result of theatres being closed due to COVID-19 pandemic. Menon further added that the film will be "an event film in bringing back audiences to theatres". Vels Film International, a production studio led by Ishari K. Ganesh agreed to distribute and fund the project, in their third successive collaboration after Enai Noki Paayum Thota and Joshua Imai Pol Kaakha. In mid-2021, it has been reported that Menon had shot about four-and-a-half hour long footage in the production, and has decided to split the film into two-parts. However, the prospects did not materialize as planned and the film continued to remain unreleased.

References

External links 

Film productions suspended due to the COVID-19 pandemic
Films directed by Gautham Vasudev Menon
Films postponed due to the COVID-19 pandemic
Films scored by Harris Jayaraj
Films shot in Abu Dhabi
Films shot in Bulgaria
Films shot in Chennai
Films shot in Europe
Films shot in Georgia (country)
Films shot in India
Films shot in Istanbul
Films shot in New York (state)
Films shot in New York City
Films shot in Slovenia
Films shot in Tbilisi
Films shot in the United Arab Emirates
Films shot in Turkey
Indian action thriller films
Indian films set in New York City
Indian spy thriller films
Upcoming films
Upcoming Tamil-language films